Molly Wizenberg is an American chef, entrepreneur, and writer. She is the author of a food blog, Orangette, which won a James Beard Award for food writing in 2015. She has also written a memoir, The Fixed Stars, which won a Stonewall Book Award in 2021, and her previous recipe book/memoir, titled A Homemade Life, was a New York Times bestseller.

Career 
Wizenberg began her career studying anthropology, but did not complete her Ph.D. In 2004, she started a food blog, Orangette. In 2015, she won the James Beard Foundation Award for best individual blog (for Orangette). Wizenberg authored a book, titled A Homemade Life: Stories and Recipes from My Kitchen Table, which consisted of recipes and memoirs, and became a New York Times best-seller. In 2009, Wizenberg co-founded a Seattle-based pizzeria named Delancey, with her (now ex) husband, Brandon Pettit. She also wrote a book, titled Delancey: A Man, A Woman, A Marriage, which was an account of establishing the pizzeria, as well as a personal memoir. Since 2010, Wizenberg has co-hosted a podcast about food titled Spilled Milk, with Matthew Amster-Burton.

Personal life 
Wizenberg met her former husband, Brandon Pettit, after he read her blog and contacted her about it. She had one daughter with him, June, before they divorced. In 2016, Wizenburg published a post on her blog, coming out and writing that she was "not straight anymore." Wizenberg has since remarried, to Ash Wizenberg-Choi. She has written a memoir about her personal life, and relationships, titled The Fixed Stars, which won a Stonewall Book Award in 2021.

Bibliography 
A Homemade Life: Stories and Recipes from My Kitchen Table (2010) 
Delancey: A Man, A Woman, A Restaurant, A Marriage (2015) 
The Fixed Stars (2021)

References 

21st-century American writers
21st-century American women writers
American women chefs
American food writers
Living people
Year of birth missing (living people)